James Henry York (July 11, 1895 – September 11, 1934) was an American Negro league catcher for the Bacharach Giants and Hilldale Club between 1918 and 1923.

A native of St. Peters, Pennsylvania, York died in Chester, Pennsylvania in 1934 at age 39.

References

External links
 and Baseball-Reference Black Baseball stats and Seamheads

1895 births
1934 deaths
Bacharach Giants players
Hilldale Club players
20th-century African-American sportspeople
Baseball catchers